Galaxy Craze (born 1972) a British-American novelist and former actress.

Biography 
Craze was born in London, England and moved to the United States with her mother in 1980. She appeared in a few independent films in the 1990s, such as Pigeonholed (1999) and The Second Bakery Attack (1998). She graduated from Barnard College in 1993. Craze had her first novel, By the Shore, published in 1999, and followed up with a sequel, Tiger, Tiger, in 2008.  Craze told an interviewer that she "Didn't say I wanted to be a writer, I just knew that's what I like to do."

Filmography

Bibliography
 By the Shore, Atlantic Monthly Press, May 1999. 
 Tiger, Tiger, Grove Press, 2008. 
 The Last Princess, Poppy, May 2012. 
 Invasion, Poppy, 2015. 
 "Mapmaker"

References

External links

1972 births
British emigrants to the United States
American film actresses
20th-century American novelists
Barnard College alumni
Living people
21st-century American novelists
American women novelists
20th-century American women writers
21st-century American women writers